The 2017 Liga 3 South Kalimantan is the third edition of Liga 3 South Kalimantan as a qualifying round for the national round of 2017 Liga 3. Perseban Banjarmasin are the defending champions.

The competition scheduled starts on 14 May 2017.

Teams
There are 12 clubs which will participate the league in this season.

References 

2017 in Indonesian football
South Kalimantan